Jacco Eltingh and Paul Haarhuis were the defending champions but lost in the semifinals to Patrick Galbraith and Jonathan Stark.

Galbraith and Stark won in the final 7–6, 6–4 against Todd Martin and Chris Woodruff.

Seeds

 Jacco Eltingh /  Paul Haarhuis (semifinals)
 Jonas Björkman /  Nicklas Kulti (first round)
 Jim Grabb /  Richey Reneberg (quarterfinals)
 Patrick Galbraith /  Jonathan Stark (champions)

Draw

External links
 1996 Stockholm Open Doubles draw

Doubles
1996 Stockholm Open